Jiří Mainuš (born 8 January 1945) is a former Czech cyclist. He competed in the team time trial at the 1972 Summer Olympics.

References

External links
 

1945 births
Living people
Czech male cyclists
Olympic cyclists of Czechoslovakia
Cyclists at the 1972 Summer Olympics
Place of birth missing (living people)